Aleksandr Leonov (born July 17, 1978) is a boxer from Russia, who competed for his native country at the 2000 Summer Olympics in Sydney, Australia.

Leonov is best known for winning the gold medal at 2000 European Amateur Boxing Championships in the Men's Light-Welterweight (– 63.5 kg) division. In the final he defeated Bulgaria's Dimitar Stilianov.

References
 

1978 births
Living people
Light-welterweight boxers
Boxers at the 2000 Summer Olympics
Olympic boxers of Russia
Martial artists from Moscow
Russian male boxers